Estadio Huancayo is a multi-use stadium in Huancayo, Peru.  It is currently used mostly for football matches and is the home of Sport Huancayo and Deportivo Junín. Other teams that previously used the stadium are Deportivo Wanka and Meteor Junin. The stadium holds 20,000 people.

External links
World Stadiums
Huancayo's tourist information web page

Huancayo
Buildings and structures in Junín Region